The Uzungwe vlei rat (Otomys uzungwensis) is a species of rodent in the family Muridae.
It is found in Malawi, Tanzania, and Zambia.
Its natural habitats are subtropical or tropical high-altitude grassland and swamps.
It is threatened by habitat loss.

References

 Taylor, P., Maree, S. & Chitaukali, W. 2004.  Otomys uzungwensis.   2006 IUCN Red List of Threatened Species.   Downloaded on 19 July 2007.

Further reading
 
 

Otomys
Mammals described in 1953
Taxonomy articles created by Polbot